The 2011 Indonesia Open Superseries Premier was the sixth super series tournament of the 2011 BWF Superseries. The tournament was held in Jakarta, Indonesia from 21 to 26 June 2011 and had a total purse of $600,000.

Men's singles

Seeds

  Lee Chong Wei (champions)
  Lin Dan (second round)
  Taufik Hidayat (quarterfinals)
  Chen Long (semifinals)
  Peter Gade (final)
  Boonsak Ponsana (first round)
  Nguyễn Tiến Minh (quarterfinals)
  Park Sung-hwan (second round)

Top half

Bottom half

Finals

Women's singles

Seeds

  Wang Shixian (second round)
  Wang Xin (first round)
  Wang Yihan (champions)
  Saina Nehwal (final)
  Bae Youn-joo (first round)
  Jiang Yanjiao (semifinals)
  Liu Xin (quarterfinals)
  Tine Baun (quarterfinals)

Top half

Bottom half

Finals

Men's doubles

Seeds

  Mathias Boe / Carsten Mogensen (quarterfinals)
  Jung Jae-sung / Lee Yong-dae (second round)
  Cai Yun / Fu Haifeng (champions)
  Koo Kien Keat / Tan Boon Heong (quarterfinals)
  Ko Sung-hyun / Yoo Yeon-seong (quarterfinals)
  Fang Chieh-min / Lee Sheng-mu (second round)
  Markis Kido / Hendra Setiawan (semifinals)
  Chai Biao / Guo Zhendong (final)

Top half

Bottom half

Finals

Women's doubles

Seeds

  Wang Xiaoli / Yu Yang (champions)
  Cheng Wen-hsing / Chien Yu-chin (second round)
  Miyuki Maeda / Satoko Suetsuna (first round)
  Mizuki Fujii / Reika Kakiiwa (semifinals)
  Ha Jung-eun / Kim Min-jung (quarterfinals)
  Meiliana Jauhari / Greysia Polii (quarterfinals)
  Shizuka Matsuo / Mami Naito (quarterfinals)
  Duanganong Aroonkesorn / Kunchala Voravichitchaikul (first round)

Top half

Bottom half

Finals

Mixed doubles

Seeds

  Zhang Nan / Zhao Yunlei (champions)
  Sudket Prapakamol / Saralee Thoungthongkam (quarterfinals)
  Joachim Fischer Nielsen / Christinna Pedersen (second round)
  Tantowi Ahmad / Lilyana Natsir (final)
  Tao Jiaming / Tian Qing (quarterfinals)
  Robert Mateusiak / Nadieżda Zięba (first round)
  Songphon Anugritayawon / Kunchala Voravichitchaikul (first round)
  Thomas Laybourn / Kamilla Rytter Juhl (semifinals)

Top half

Bottom half

Finals

References 

2011 Indonesia Super Series
Indonesia Super Series
Indonesia Premier
June 2011 sports events in Asia